"Turn to Gold" is a 1984 hit single by David Austin.  It was co-written by George Michael.  Michael provides accompanying vocals on the song with Austin.

The song is the title track of a mini-album by Austin.  George Michael co-wrote and/or sang back-up on most of the LP's other songs.  The album contained an extended remix of "Turn to Gold," which was also released.

"Turn to Gold" was released in Europe and Japan but not North America.  It reached number 68 on the UK Singles Chart during the summer of 1984, just a few weeks before the release of Michael's first major hit single with Wham!, "Wake Me Up Before You Go-Go".

Charts

References

External links
 Lyrics of this song
 

1984 songs
1984 singles
British pop songs
Songs written by George Michael
Song recordings produced by George Michael
Songs written by David Austin (singer)
George Michael songs
Parlophone singles